Mastixis is a genus of moths of the family Noctuidae described by Schaus in 1913.

Species
Mastixis aeneas Schaus, 1916
Mastixis albilimbata Dognin, 1914
Mastixis angitia (Druce, 1891)
Mastixis anthores (Druce, 1891)
Mastixis aonia (Druce, 1891)
Mastixis apsinthes (Druce, 1891)
Mastixis aspisalis (Walker, 1859)
Mastixis castronalis Schaus, 1916
Mastixis chloe Schaus, 1913
Mastixis comptulalis (Guenee, 1854)
Mastixis dukinfieldi Schaus, 1916
Mastixis galealis (Felder & Rogenhofer, 1874)
Mastixis hippocoon Schaus, 1916
Mastixis hyades Dognin, 1914
Mastixis infuscata Dognin, 1914
Mastixis languida Dognin, 1914
Mastixis lineata (Schaus, 1906)
Mastixis lysaniax (Druce, 1891)
Mastixis macedo (Druce, 1891)
Mastixis plumalis (Felder & Rogenhofer, 1874)
Mastixis rilmela Dyar, 1927
Mastixis stalemusalis (Walker, 1859)
Mastixis tessellata (Druce, 1891)
Mastixis turrialbensis Schaus, 1913

References

Herminiinae